The Justified World Tour (also known as the Justified and Lovin' It Live) was the debut concert tour by American singer-songwriter Justin Timberlake. The tour showcased material his debut studio album, Justified (2002).

Background
In September 2003, McDonald's announced Timberlake as a new spokesmen for their "I'm Lovin' It" campaign. Timberlake recorded "I'm Lovin' It", to be featured in ads for the franchise, later expanded and released as a single in December 2003. McDonald's later announced they will sponsor a tour for Timberlake, following his successful North American tour with Christina Aguilera. Timberlake stated, "I love what McDonald's is doing with the new 'i'm lovin' it' campaign and it's cool to be part of it [...] We share the same crowd -- people who like to have fun -- and that's what this new partnership and my European concert tour is all about." The tour begin with Timberlake playing intimate gigs at clubs and theatres in the United States and Australia before expanding to arenas in Europe. After select shows in the U.K., Timberlake performed at local clubs and theatres following his performance in that city.

Opening acts
Lemar (Europe, select venues)
Solange (United Kingdom)
Fefe Dobson (Europe, select venues)
*NSYNC in (Argentina and Mexico).

Set list
"Rock Your Body"
"Right for Me"
"Gone"
"Girlfriend"
"Señorita"
"Still on My Brain"
"Nothin' Else"
"Cry Me a River"
"Let's Take a Ride"
"Beatbox Interlude"
"Last Night"
"I'm Lovin' It"
"Take Me Now"
"Take It from Here"
"Like I Love You"
Source:

Tour dates

Broadcasts and recordings
A live video album titled Justin Timberlake: Live from London was released on December 16, 2003.

References

See also
I'm Lovin' It Campaign

Justin Timberlake concert tours
2003 concert tours
2004 concert tours